Mont Foster is a Canadian drama film, directed by Louis Godbout and released in 2020. Freely adapted from the poem Erlkönig by Goethe, the film stars Patrick Hivon and Laurence Leboeuf as Mathieu and Chloé, a couple spending time at an isolated cabin in the country, where Chloé begins to go crazy after seeing and hearing strange visions.

The cast also includes Lucie Laurier, Émile Proulx-Cloutier and Laurent Lucas.

The film premiered in October 2019 at the São Paulo International Film Festival, before having its Canadian premiere in March 2020 at the Rendez-vous Québec Cinéma.

The film received two Prix Iris nominations at the 22nd Quebec Cinema Awards in 2021, for Best Actor (Hivon) and the Public Prize.

References

External links

2019 films
2019 thriller films
Canadian thriller films
Quebec films
French-language Canadian films
2010s Canadian films